The sport of football in the country of Malawi is run by the Football Association of Malawi. The association administers the national football team, as well as the Super League of Malawi. Football is the most popular sport in Malawi.

History

The Nyasaland Football Association was formed in 1938.

National team

In the  2021 Africa Cup of Nations Malawi reached the second round of the competition for the first time.

Bibliography

A History of Nyasaland and Malawi Football: Volume 1 1935 to 1969

Football stadiums in Malawi

References